The discography of Do As Infinity, a J-pop and rock band formed in Aoyama, Tokyo, Japan, consists of 13 studio albums, 5 live albums, 10 compilation albums, 31 singles, 19 video releases, and 39 music videos. Composer Dai Nagao of Avex Trax hosted auditions for a band in 1999, eventually choosing Tomiko Van as lead vocalist and Ryo Owatari as guitarist. The trio released their first single "Tangerine Dream" in 1999 and released three more singles between 1999 and 2000 which appeared on their debut album Break of Dawn (2000). Break of Dawn did well commercially, peaking at No. 3 on the Japanese Oricon albums chart. In December 2000, Nagao decided to devote all his time to composing the music and no longer appeared at live events. Do As Infinity's next two studio albums released in 2001, New World and Deep Forest, both peaked at No. 1 on Oricon. The band released their first greatest hits compilation album Do the Best in 2002, which also charted at No. 1. Do As Infinity's next three studio albums charted in the top 5 of Oricon: True Song (2002) at No. 5, Gates of Heaven (2003) at No. 3, and Need Your Love (2005) also at No. 3.

Following the release of their A-side singles compilation album Do the A-side, Do As Infinity disbanded in September 2005, with Van pursuing a solo career, Owatari working with his band Missile Innovation formed in 2004, and Nagao continuing to work with other artists at Avex Trax, such as Amasia Landscape. Three years later in September 2008, the band reformed with Van and Owatari, though Nagao did not return. Do As Infinity released their 21st single "∞1" in June 2009 which peaked at No. 10 on Oricon, followed by their seventh studio album Eternal Flame in September 2009, which peaked at No. 9 on Oricon. The band's eighth studio album Eight (2011) peaked at No. 4 on Oricon. Do As Infinity released two studio albums in 2012: Time Machine which peaked at No. 14 on Oricon, and Do As Infinity X which peaked at No. 15 on Oricon. The band's 11th studio album Brand New Days was released in 2015, and their 12th studio album Alive was released in 2018.

Albums

Studio albums

Live albums

Compilation albums

Box set

Singles

Videos

Music videos

Other album appearances

Soundtracks

Various artist compilation albums

Additional songs

Other video album appearances

Notes
 "Under the Sun" was later released on True Song, but "Under the Moon" was not released on an album until Do the A-side.
 Of the four songs released on "∞1", only "Umareyuku Monotachi e" and "Meramera" were later released on Eternal Flame. The other two songs, "Timeless" and "Let's Get Together at A-Nation", were not placed on an album.
 Of the four songs released on "∞2", only "1/100" and "Everything Will Be All Right" were later released on Eight. The other two songs, "Haruka" and "Pile Driver", were not placed on an album.
 "Jidaishin" was sold exclusively online on Mu-Mo Shop, where it subsequently sold out, and on the iTunes Store. Due to this, the single was not placed on the Oricon singles chart.

References
General

Specific

External links
Do As Infinity's official website 
Do As Infinity at Discogs

Discographies of Japanese artists
Pop music group discographies
Rock music group discographies